Springer Spaniel refers to two different breeds of dogs, both of which are commonly called simply Springer Spaniel:

English Springer Spaniel
Welsh Springer Spaniel